Joseph Volotsky — also known as Joseph of Volotsk or Joseph of Volokolamsk; secular name Ivan Sanin (1439 or 1440 – September 9, 1515) — was a prominent Russian theologian and early proponent of tsarist autocracy, who led the party defending monastic landownership. The Russian Orthodox Church considers him a saint (along with his most notable opponent, Nilus of Sora); his memory is celebrated on 9 September and 18 October (dates in the Julian Calendar).

Background

Joseph Volotsky came from a family of a wealthy landowner (a votchinnik) whose property consisted of the Yazvishche village in the Principaity of Volokolamsk, Moscow Oblast. He learned to read and write at the local monastery and then took the tonsure at the Borovsk Monastery in 1459. Upon the death of its abbot, St. Paphnutius of Borovsk, Joseph Volotsky took his place and attempted to introduce a strict monastic charter. The monks, however, rebuffed his idea, and he had to leave the monastery for good. After having lived in a few other monasteries, Joseph became disappointed with their lax morals and founded his own cloister in 1479 near Volokolamsk, which would become known as the Joseph-Volokolamsk Monastery. Joseph's charter prescribed a monk's chief virtue as absolute obedience to his abbot. All aspects of a monk's life at the monastery were regulated and controlled.

Initially, Joseph Volotsky was connected with the appanage princes of Volokolamsk (brothers of Ivan III) and defended the right of local ecclesiastical and secular feudatories to oppose the authority of the grand prince. Later in his life he severed his relations with the opposition and took the side of the grand prince, sealing this alliance by transferring Joseph-Volokolamsk Monastery to the patronage of Vasili III in 1507.

Struggle against the non-possessors

During the Church Sobor of 1503, Joseph Volotsky and his supporters (Josephites) managed to scrap the project of elimination of monastic landownership, proposed by the nestiazhateli, or non-possessors (those who opposed monastic landownership), in the persons of the so-called Transvolgan elders led by Nilus of Sora and Vassian Patrikeyev. Joseph Volotsky addressed a number of epistles to the nestiazhateli, in which he tried to prove the legality of monastic landownership and to justify the rich décor of churches. 
Eventually, Joseph Volotsky gained the upper hand and the monasteries preserved their landholdings.

Ideas on the authority of the tsar

The triumph of the possessor party went hand in hand with Joseph's efforts to bolster the position of Russia's grand princes, who were now increasingly referred to as tsars, succeeding to the title of universal emperors of Byzantium. Joseph Volotsky restated the formula of an early Byzantine ecclesiastical writer Agapetus that the tsar was a "man in essence, but his power is that of God" and that he was God's deputy on Earth.  According to Joseph, however, since the main duty of the tsar is to care for the well-being of the Christian Church, he is legitimate only as long as he adheres to Church rules and moral obligations.

Struggle against heresies

Joseph Volotsky is also known to have been a staunch opponent of the heretical sect which was spreading in Russia at that time ("Judaizers"). During the Church Sobor of 1504, he demanded that all heretics be executed by the state.

In his major work, called The Enlightener (Просветитель), which consisted of 16 chapters, he tried to prove the wrongfulness of the "new teaching" in order to be able to prosecute the heretics and convince people not to believe in the sincerity of their repentance. Taking inspiration from the Roman-Byzantine treatment of heresiarchs and the Dominican-led persecutions in Spain and Portugal, he called for a civil inquisition against heretics and championed their imprisonment and execution. As with the controversy over monastic ownership of estates, Joseph Volotsky was opposed in this matter by Saint Nilus of Sora.

Joseph's sainthood was officially accepted by the Russian Orthodox Church following his local canonization in 1579 and national canonization in 1591.

References

External links
Russian biography
Saint Joseph's epistle on veneration of holy icons
 T. Allan Smith, "Divine economy and repentance in Discourse 4 of The Enlightener by Iosif Volotskii," Canadian Slavonic Papers 60, no.1-2 (2018)

People of the Grand Duchy of Moscow
Russian theologians
Russian saints of the Eastern Orthodox Church
1515 deaths
16th-century Christian saints
Year of birth unknown
15th-century Eastern Orthodox theologians
16th-century Eastern Orthodox theologians
15th-century Russian writers
16th-century Russian writers